YRF Spy Universe is an Indian shared universe centered on a series of spy action-thriller films, which feature various fictional RAW agents. It is produced and distributed by Yash Raj Films.

Overview 
The shared universe, initially started out as a single movie series, later was established by crossing over common plot elements, settings, cast, and characters.

The first film Ek Tha Tiger (2012) and its sequel Tiger Zinda Hai (2017) centre on a fictional R&AW agent played by Salman Khan. War (2019) tells the story of a RAW agent played by Hrithik Roshan who goes rogue. Before making War, producer Aditya Chopra and director Siddharth Anand came up with the idea of merging these films and creating a shared universe by crossing over the characters who all belong to the RAW. However, War was still made as a standalone film without directly connecting to the first two Tiger films—supporting the idea of creating a proper foundation for the War characters before a proper crossover.

Pathaan (2023) starring Shah Rukh Khan as the titular character and a RAW agent, directed by Anand, is the first film to have characters appearing from both the Tiger franchise and War. It is the fourth film in the SPY Universe and the first YRF film to have a crossover.

Films

Ek Tha Tiger (2012)

RAW agent Avinash "Tiger" Singh Rathore, is sent to Dublin to observe an Indian scientist who is suspected of sharing nuclear secrets with the ISI. He meets and falls for his caretaker Zoya Humaimi, who in reality is actually an ISI agent.

Ek Tha Tiger is the first installment of the shared universe and was released on 15 August 2012 worldwide. The film earned ₹325 crore worldwide against a budget of ₹75 crore, becoming one of the highest-grossing Bollywood films by international gross.

Tiger Zinda Hai (2017)

Tiger and Zoya join forces with RAW and ISI in order to rescue a group of nurses, who are held hostage by ISC, an Iraqi terrorist organization headed by Abu Usman.

Tiger Zinda Hai is the second installment of the shared universe, and is based on true incidents that happened in 2014 the abduction of Indian nurses by ISIL. Tiger Zinda Hai  was released on 22 December 2017 and made a new non-holiday record in India as it collected 34.1crore nett on its first day. It went on to collect ₹35.30 crore gross on second day. The film recorded the second highest day of all time. It netted Rs 154 crore in its first four days in India. The film grossed 565crore worldwide becoming the eighth highest-grossing Indian film. At the 63rd Filmfare Awards, it won for Best Action.

War (2019)

Kabir, a skilled RAW agent, goes rogue after a mission to catch a terrorist named Rizwan Illiyasi goes awry. However, his boss sends Khalid, another agent and Kabir's student to track him down.

War is the third installment of the shared universe, which was commissioned after the success of the previous films, and was directed by Siddharth Anand, starring Hrithik Roshan, Vaani Kapoor and Tiger Shroff in lead roles. It was released on 2 October 2019, coinciding with the Gandhi Jayanti. Proving to be similarly successful to the first entry in the series, the film emerged as a huge box office success, becoming the highest-grossing Bollywood film of 2019 and one of the highest-grossing Indian films of all time.

Pathaan (2023)

Pathaan, an exiled RAW agent is assigned to take down Jim, a former RAW agent-turned-traitor and the leader of "Outfit X", a private terror organization which is planning to spread a deadly lab generated virus dubbed "Raktbeej" across India.

Pathaan is the fourth installment in the shared universe directed by Siddharth Anand, and the first YRF Spy Universe movie to feature a mid-credits scene as inspired from the Marvel Cinematic Universe. The film stars Shah Rukh Khan, Deepika Padukone and John Abraham in the lead roles. Salman Khan appears in extended cameo role as "Tiger". It is the most expensive project of Yash Raj Films.

Tiger 3 (2023) 
The fifth installment of the shared universe and a sequel to Tiger Zinda Hai, will feature Salman Khan and Katrina Kaif, reprising their eponymous roles, with Emraan Hashmi playing the antagonist. Both Shah Rukh Khan and Hrithik Roshan will reprise their roles from Pathaan and War.  It is being directed by Maneesh Sharma.

Cast and Characters 
This table lists the main characters who appear in the YRF Spy Universe.

Crew

Reception

Box office performance 
The universe has been notable for its profit.

Critical and public response

Ek Tha Tiger (2012)

In India, there was praise for the film's feminist themes, with Marjolaine Gout noting the film is "a roaring, visual, comic feast where the damsel in distress fights back", giving Ek Tha Tiger 3.5 out of 5 stars. Anupama Chopra of the Hindustan Times also commended the feminist themes, saying "it's such a pleasure to see a Hindi film heroine not [be] a damsel in distress", while also praising the film's action sequences, giving Ek Tha Tiger 3 out of 5 stars.

Jahanavi Samant of Mid-Day gave the film the same rating and criticized its tone as being inconsistent, with "Ek Tha Tiger [being] unable to decide whether it is spy action or a love saga". Ronnie Scheib of Variety gave a positive review, praising the performances of the leads and film's production aesthetic, noting "Kaif impresses in her action-heroine debut, while Salman Khan's thinking-on-his-feet immediacy adds depth to his usual macho muscle. Local audiences will no doubt derive a special thrill from the onscreen reunion of stars Khan and Kaif, [with] Aseem Mishra's gorgeous location lensing".

Tiger Zinda Hai (2017)

Tiger Zinda Hai opened to mostly positive reviews. Taran Adarsh of Bollywood Hungama gave 4.5 stars, and said "Salman is the lifeline, the real treasure of Tiger Zinda Hai. He sinks his teeth into the character and, in several sequences, peels off the mask of super-stardom and brings the actor to the fore. Katrina is in solid form, in action sequences specifically commands attention." Umesh Punwani of Koimoi gave 4 stars, and said "Katrina Kaif is brilliant! She has very few dialogues, and no, that's not the reason she's good. Working amazingly well with her expressions, she has turned into an athlete for this one. Performing a few major action sequences, she is flawless."

Lasyapriya Sundaram of The Times of India gave 3.5 stars, and said "The film is visually stunning in parts and Salman Khan plays Tiger with roaring confidence and dialogues packed with punch. Of course, his fans get a true-blue Salman Khan moment when he bares his torso." Rachit Gupta of Filmfare gave 3.5 stars, and said "It may look like a Hollywood action thriller, but at its heart, Tiger Zinda Hai is an unabashed masala movie. The heady mixture of an international looking action film and the regular tropes of Hindi cinema make it a pleasing watch."

War (2019)

Anupama Chopra said "War is a popcorn entertainer and you can't ask too many questions but if you're willing to suspend disbelief, the twists and turns exert a solid grip." A writer for Bollywood Hungama gave the film 4 stars, and said "War is an action entertainer which has style as well as enough twists and turns to keep the viewers engrossed. At the box office, the extended weekend, dazzling action, stunning international locales and stylish execution will ensure mammoth footfalls for the film". Taran Adarsh gave it four stars out of five and called the film "[e]scapist cinema at its best".

Komal Nahta of Film Information opined, "The film could prove to be the starting of a new franchise for the Yash Raj Films banner". Writing for India TV, Sonal gave the film 3.5 stars, writing, "Hrithik Roshan, Tiger Shroff of Abbas-Mustan kinda twists, turns, characters, situations, logic, gravity, physics, chemistry, and some Ekta Kapoor-esque tricks all tossed together to make a visually spectacular concoction".The Times of India rated it three stars out of five and felt the film had "lot of style, stunts and show, but lacking a solid storyline".

Pathaan (2023) 

Taran Adarsh of Bollywood Hungama rated the film 4.5 out of 5 stars and termed the film "complete entertainer replete with action, emotions, patriotism, humour, thrill, and of course, the star power of Shah Rukh Khan." Sukanya Verma of Rediff gave the film a rating of 4 out of 5 stars and  wrote "Shah Rukh Khan's weathered intensity, grizzly charisma and trademark wit lends Pathaan's all-out, devil-may-care antics a sense of purpose that evades mindless acts of mayhem". Devesh Sharma of Filmfare rated the film 4 out of 5 stars and stated that the film is a "visual spectacle" and termed action choreography is "truly out of this world". Saibal Chatterjee of NDTV rated the film 3.5 out of 5 and said that the film swings and strikes with all the "style" and "aplomb" in the world.

Renuka Vyavahare of The Times of India rated the film 3.5 out of 5 stars and wrote "Pathaan has all the ingredients of a masala potboiler — slowmo entries, iconic battle of good versus bad and most importantly a sexy-smouldering Shah Rukh Khan, who can fight the good fight on and off the screen". Himesh Mankad of Pinkvilla gave the film a rating of 3.5 out of 5 and termed it as "tentpole event film" which has right amount of action, thrill, emotion and drama.

Graphic novels
 A graphic novel titled Ek Tha Tiger: Mahasagar Ki Suraksha (English: Ek Tha Tiger: Saving The High Seas) was published in 2012 by Yomics. Post release, the comic failed to generate a positive word-of-mouth. Joginder Tuteja of Bollywood Hungama commended the comics' design but said that the main story failed to meet his expectations of a deeper plot, exciting narrative and a tighter script.
 Another graphic novel named Ek Tha Tiger: Caught In The Web has been published in 2012 by Yomics, which also features some Hum Tum characters.

Games
 An Android game base on the 2012 film has been released on the same year.
 Another game based on the 2012 film has been released on the same year, which is a Windows version game published by skf.

See also
 Lokesh Cinematic Universe
 HIT (franchise)

References

External links
  at Bollywood Hungama
 
https://www.indianmoviereviews.com/2023/03/3.html}}
 
 
 
 Box Office at Bollywood Hungama

Film series introduced in 2012
Shared universes
Indian film series
Spy film series
Films about the Research and Analysis Wing
Action film franchises
Thriller film series